WSGH (1040 AM) is a radio station broadcasting a spanish language format. Licensed to Lewisville, NC, United States, it serves the Greensboro, NC area.  The station is currently owned by Mahan Janbakhsh's TBLC Holdings, LLC, through licensee TBLC Greensboro Stations, LLC.

1040 AM is a clear-channel frequency, on which WHO in Des Moines, Iowa is the Class A dominant station; WSGH must reduce nighttime power in order to prevent interference to WHO.

History
On May 1, 2001, WTOB began broadcasting "La Movidita," which had previously aired on WSGH, from 10 A.M. to 5 P.M. weekdays and all day on weekends.

In 2003, Truth Broadcasting stopped selling time to La Movidita, which moved back to WSGH. Que Pasa moved from WSGH to WTOB and WWBG.

References

External links
 activatriad.com facebook

SGH
Radio stations established in 1987
1987 establishments in North Carolina